The 1990 Montreal Expos season was the 22nd season in franchise history. An 85-77 record was good enough to put them in 3rd place and 10 games behind the Pittsburgh Pirates.

Offseason
October 26, 1989: Yamil Benitez was signed by the Montreal Expos as an amateur free agent.
December 7, 1989: Oil Can Boyd signed as a free agent with the Montreal Expos.
December 7, 1989: Keith Atherton was signed as a free agent with the Montreal Expos.
January 24, 1990: John Candelaria was released by the Montreal Expos.
March 17, 1990: Eric Bullock was signed as a free agent with the Montreal Expos.

Spring training
The Expos held spring training at West Palm Beach Municipal Stadium in West Palm Beach, Florida – a facility they shared with the Atlanta Braves. It was their 14th season at the stadium; they had conducted spring training there from 1969 to 1972 and since 1981.

Regular season

Season standings

Record vs. opponents

Opening Day starters
Delino DeShields
Andrés Galarraga
Marquis Grissom
Kevin Gross
Spike Owen
Tim Raines
Nelson Santovenia
Larry Walker
Tim Wallach

Notable transactions
April 23, 1990: Rex Hudler was traded by the Montreal Expos to the St. Louis Cardinals for John Costello.
June 4, 1990: Shane Andrews, Rondell White, Gabe White, Stan Spencer, Ben Van Ryn and Stan Robertson were drafted by the Expos in the 1st round of the 1990 amateur draft.
June 18, 1990: Rolando Roomes was selected off waivers by the Montreal Expos from the Cincinnati Reds.
July 2, 1990: Ugueth Urbina was signed by the Montreal Expos as an amateur free agent.
August 8, 1990: Zane Smith was traded by the Montreal Expos to the Pittsburgh Pirates for a player to be named later, Scott Ruskin, and Willie Greene. The Pittsburgh Pirates sent Moisés Alou (August 16, 1990) to the Montreal Expos to complete the trade.

Roster

Player stats

Batting

Starters by position 
Note: Pos = Position; G = Games played; AB = At bats; H = Hits; Avg. = Batting average; HR = Home runs; RBI = Runs batted in

Other batters 
Note: G = Games played; AB = At bats; H = Hits; Avg. = Batting average; HR = Home runs; RBI = Runs batted in

Pitching

Starting pitchers 
Note: G = Games pitched; IP = Innings pitched; W = Wins; L = Losses; ERA = Earned run average; SO = Strikeouts

Other pitchers 
Note: G = Games pitched; IP = Innings pitched; W = Wins; L = Losses; ERA = Earned run average; SO = Strikeouts

Relief pitchers 
Note: G = Games pitched; W = Wins; L = Losses; SV = Saves; ERA = Earned run average; SO = Strikeouts

Awards and honors 

1990 Major League Baseball All-Star Game

Farm system

References

External links
 1990 Montreal Expos team at Baseball-Reference
 1990 Montreal Expos team at baseball-almanac.com

Montreal Expos seasons
Montreal Expos season
1990 in Quebec
1990s in Montreal